2gether  may refer to:

 2gether (band), an American fictional boy band, and associated TV film and series
 2gether (2gether album), the band's first studio album
 2gether: Again, 2000 album by 2gether
 2gether: The Series (American TV series), 2000 American sitcom
 2gether (Warren Vaché and Bill Charlap album), 2001
 2gether (CNBLUE album), 2015 album
 "2gether" (song), by Roger Sanchez and Far East Movement, 2011
 "2gether", a song by the New Power Generation from their 1993 album Goldnigga
 "2Gether (Enterlude)", a song by Steve Lacy from his 2022 album Gemini Rights
 2gether NHS Foundation Trust
 2gether: The Series (Thai TV series), a 2020 Thai television series
 Still 2gether, a 2020 Thai television series and sequel
 2gether: The Movie, a 2021 Thai film

See also
Together (disambiguation)